Gustavo Marques Alves dos Santos (born 9 October 2000), known as Gustavo Marques, is a Brazilian professional footballer who plays as a central defender for Portuguese club Torreense, on loan from América Mineiro.

Club career
Born in Belo Horizonte, Minas Gerais, Gustavo Marques joined América Mineiro's youth setup in 2017. On 4 December 2020, he was loaned to Luverdense until the following February.

Upon returning, Gustavo Marques was assigned back to the under-20s, but was promoted to the first team in December 2021, He made his senior debut on 25 January 2022, starting in a 1–2 Campeonato Mineiro away loss against Caldense.

On 10 March 2022, Gustavo Marques renewed his contract until December 2024. He scored his first senior goal thirteen days later, netting his team's only in a 1–3 loss at Tombense.

Gustavo Marques made his Série A debut on 29 May 2022, coming on as a half-time substitute for Iago Maidana in a 1–1 away draw against Corinthians.

Career statistics

References

2000 births
Living people
Footballers from Belo Horizonte
Brazilian footballers
Association football defenders
Campeonato Brasileiro Série A players
América Futebol Clube (MG) players
Luverdense Esporte Clube players
S.C.U. Torreense players
Brazilian expatriate footballers
Brazilian expatriate sportspeople in Portugal
Expatriate footballers in Portugal